Sabrina Lois Bartlett (born September 1991) is an English actress. She is known for her roles in the BBC One miniseries The Passing Bells (2014), the third series of the ITV drama Victoria (2019), and the first series of Knightfall (2017) on History, Bridgerton (2020) on Netflix and the first series of The Larkins (2021), also on ITV.

Early life and education
Bartlett was born in Hammersmith and grew up on Walham Grove in Fulham. Both her parents are artists, and she has two sisters and a brother. Her family spent a few years living between London and the English coast. Her grandfather is of Indian descent and was from Calcutta.

Prior to acting, she danced at Tring Park School for the Performing Arts in Hertfordshire. She then went on to train at Guildford School of Acting, graduating in 2013.

Career
Bartlett landed her first major role in The Passing Bells, a 2014 BBC One World War I television drama. She had a guest role in the Doctor Who series 8 episode "Robot of Sherwood". She played the recurring roles of Sophia and Keren Smith in Da Vinci's Demons and Poldark respectively.

In 2016, Bartlett appeared in the sixth season finale of the HBO series Game of Thrones, "The Winds of Winter" as a member of House Frey, then revealed to be Arya Stark in disguise. She starred as Princess Isabella in the first season of the History series Knightfall.

Bartlett was cast as Abigail Turner in the 2019 third season of Victoria. The following year, Bartlett appeared as Siena Rosso, an opera singer with a clandestine relationship with Jonathan Bailey's character Anthony Bridgerton in the Netflix historical fiction series Bridgerton.
In 2021, she was cast as Mariette in The Larkins, the eldest of the Larkins children that Catherine Zeta-Jones previously played in the previous adaptation.

Filmography

Television

Stage

Awards and nominations

References

External links
 

Living people
1991 births
21st-century English actresses
Actresses from London
Alumni of the Guildford School of Acting
British people of Anglo-Indian descent
English people of Indian descent
English television actresses
People educated at Tring Park School for the Performing Arts
People from Fulham
People from Hammersmith